Raygorodka is a rural locality (a selo) in Chergalinsky Selsoviet of Romnensky District, Amur Oblast, Russia. The population was 25 as of 2018. There is 1 street.

Geography 
Raygorodka is located on the left bank of the Gorbyl River, 30 km north of Romny (the district's administrative centre) by road. Khokhlatskoye is the nearest rural locality.

References 

Rural localities in Romnensky District